Olympus High School is a public high school in the Granite School District in Holladay, Utah, a suburb of Salt Lake City.

Description
The school opened on September 1, 1953, with an original enrollment of 1028 students. In the fall of 1960, the largest entering sophomore class (the graduating class of 1963) in Utah's history (an estimated 935) enrolled.  Two years later the overcrowding was reduced when the new Skyline High was completed. In April 2013, the new Olympus High School building was opened for classes adjacent to the original school.  The original building was torn down after 60 years of operation.

Throughout its history, Olympus has been one of the leading academic public high schools in the state. In 1961 its orchestral and vocal music program was recognized as one of the nation's finest by the Ford Foundation, which funded a composer-in-residence for the school, an award shared with schools throughout the Granite School district.

Football

Historic rivalry

Considered one of the greatest rivalries in the state of Utah, "the Rock" is the prized rivalry trophy between Olympus and Skyline football. It is a football-shaped piece of granite, which local lore states was taken from Mt. Olympus in 1962, prior to the first contest between the two schools.  The winning school paints the Rock in their colors and displays it in their trophy case. Skyline maintains the edge, 26–23–1, but Olympus has won the Rock 7 years in a row. The two programs will have their 51st regular-season meeting in 2017.

Current
Olympus football has an all-time record of 349–251–9.  Aaron Whitehead is the head coach.  Under Whitehead, the Titans have won five of the last six region championships (2011, 2012, 2013, 2015, 2016).

State success
1984 - Beat the Alta Hawks 39–13 in the state championship game.  Olympus forced 11 turnovers, including a Utah State title game record 7 interceptions.  Finished the season 11–2.

1998 - Beat Bonneville 35–7 to win the state championship, finishing the season with a 12–0 record.

Basketball

Success
During Matt Barnes' 20 some odd-year coaching tenure at his alma mater, the Olympus High men's basketball team has won 13 Region titles. He has the most coaching wins in the history of the school.  Through the 2013–2014 season, Coach Barnes compiled a record of 300–91 (.767) for the Titans.  Olympus has consistently been a contender in the Utah State 4-A Classification State Championships.  Under Barnes they have appeared multiple times in the Final Four and Championship Game.  Numerous players have gone on to play Division I basketball after playing under Barnes.

On March 5, 2016, in Barnes' 19th season, Olympus High men's Basketball won its first state championship.

The 2017–2018 team went 27–0, winning the state championship again.

Style
Under Coach Barnes, Olympus basketball has become well known for their 3-point shooting and full-court defense.  Olympus holds several UHSAA 3-point shooting records.  The Titans hold the Utah state records for most 3-point attempts (628, 1999–2000) and makes (214, 1999–2000; 211, 1996–1997) in a single season.  They also hold the state record for most 3-point field goals in a single game, hitting 19 on Feb. 1, 2000 against Woods Cross.

Swimming
Swimming has one of the longest high school sport seasons, stretching from September to February. In 2011 there was at least one girl ranked in the top 8 in 4A in every event and at least one boy in the top 10 in all but three events in 4A.

Region
The Olympus High girls' swimming team took first in the Region VI Championships in 2010. They went undefeated in the 2010–2011 season.

State
The girls' team also took second at 4A State in 2010. There were several first-place individual finishes by the entire team in the following events: Girls' 50 Yard Freestyle, Girls' 200 Yard Freestyle, Girls' 200 Yard Freestyle Relay, Girl's 100 Yard Backstroke, Girls' 400 Yard Freestyle Relay.

Notable alumni
 David Burnett (1964) - photographer for Life, Time, People and Sports Illustrated magazines and many others;  author of photo retrospective of Bob Marley, Soul Rebel
 Merrill Douglas - former NFL player
 Paul W Draper (1997) - Anthropologist, Mentalist, Magician
 Jeffrey Glen Giauque - former U.S. Ambassador to Belarus
 Roberto Linck - professional soccer player for Major League Soccer; owner of professional soccer team Miami Dade FC; founder of Ginga Scout
 Elizabeth O'Bagy  (2005) - former senior analyst at the Institute for the Study of War
 Mary Jesse (1986) - pioneer in mobile technology, executive, entrepreneur and board member 
 Cameron Latu (2017) – Collegiate tight end
 Virginia Hinckley Pearce (1963) - author of inspirational books, former general leader of the LDS Church, and daughter of former church president Gordon Bitner Hinckley
 Ronald A. Rasband - Member of the Quorum of the Twelve Apostles of the Church of Jesus Christ of Latter-day Saints
 Karl Rove (1969) - political adviser; former Deputy White House Chief of Staff
 Ronald Scott (1963) - journalist at Time, Life, Sports Illustrated; author of Closing Circles: Trapped In The Everlasting Mormon Moment, a novel with fictional locations based on the Holladay and East Millcreek areas of Utah and its schools, including Olympus 
 Paul Kay Sybrowsky (1962) - president of Southern Virginia University; former general authority of the Church of Jesus Christ of Latter-day Saints (LDS Church)
 Jim Waldo (1969) - computer scientist, Distinguished Engineer at Sun Microsystems Laboratories, CTO of Harvard University
 John Warnock (1958) - computer scientist, co-founder of Adobe Systems
 David Zabriskie (1997) - professional road bicycle racer

See also

 List of high schools in Utah

References

External links

 
 The Library at Olympus High

Educational institutions established in 1953
Public high schools in Utah
Schools in Salt Lake County, Utah
1953 establishments in Utah